Zoran Mijucić (Serbian Cyrillic: Зоран Мијуцић; 23 December 1968 – 3 October 2009) was a Serbian footballer.

Career

Club career
Mijucić was part of the famed Vojvodina squad that won the Yugoslav First League in 1989. Later he played for Cement Beočin.

International career
Mijucić was a member of the highly talented Yugoslavian under-20 team that won the 1987 FIFA World Youth Championship in Chile, playing five games in the tournament.

Death and legacy
Mijucić died on 3 October 2009 after a lengthy battle with cancer. The Zoran Mijucić Memorial Tournament, created in 2010, is named in his honour.

Honours
Vojvodina
 Yugoslav First League: 1988–89

References

External links
 

1968 births
2009 deaths
People from Šid
Yugoslav footballers
Serbian footballers
Association football forwards
Yugoslav First League players
FK Vojvodina players
FK Cement Beočin players
Deaths from cancer in Serbia